Tebma Shipyards Limited is a Chennai based shipbuilding company in India.  The company has delivered more than 150 vessels, mainly offshore support vessels. It was shut down in June 2018 due to various reasons.

History
Tebma was incorporated in 1984 and commenced operations in 1987. It has shipyards at Malpe in Karnataka, Kochi in Kerala and Chengalpet in Tamil Nadu. On 24 November 2010, Bharati Shipyard acquired a 51 per cent stake in the Tebma Shipyards for a price of  through a fresh issue of capital at a price of Rs 19.20 per share (face value of Rs 10).  Tebma in 2011 signed a deal with Vosta LMG, one of the world's largest dredging technology firm, to build dredgers. In 2015, it delivered Dredger 1; the 1st dredger for exclusive use by Indian Navy
The yard is acquired by Cochin Shipyard Limited, Kochi in 2020

Products
It is primarily engaged in the design and construction of offshore support vessels, tugboats, dredgers, floating cranes and pilot launches.

Arga Class tugboat
Nakul class tugboat
Bhim class tugboat
Madan Singh Class tugboat
B.C. Dutt class tugboat
Fugro Voyager
Fugro Scout
Mokul Nordic

References

Shipbuilding companies of India
Shipyards of India
Companies based in Chennai
1984 establishments in Tamil Nadu
Indian companies established in 1984
Manufacturing companies established in 1984